Beketovo is a rural locality (a selo) in Podlubovsky Selsoviet, Karmaskalinsky District, Bashkortostan, Russia. The population was 633 as of 2010. There are 7 streets.

Geography 
Beketovo is located 34 km northwest of Karmaskaly (the district's administrative centre) by road. Saburovo is the nearest rural locality.

References 

Rural localities in Karmaskalinsky District